Andrew Geddes (6 September 1922 – 2 February 1958) was a Scottish professional footballer, who played as a wing half.

Career
Born in Motherwell, Geddes played for Kilmarnock, St Cuthbert Wanderers, Bradford City, Mansfield Town, Halifax Town and Glenafton Athletic.

For Bradford City he made 30 appearances in the Football League; he also made 2 FA Cup appearances.

Sources

References

1922 births
1958 deaths
Scottish footballers
Kilmarnock F.C. players
St Cuthbert Wanderers F.C. players
Bradford City A.F.C. players
Mansfield Town F.C. players
Halifax Town A.F.C. players
Glenafton Athletic F.C. players
English Football League players
Association football wing halves